The Australia national baseball team has participated in nine of the International Baseball Federation World Cup tournaments. Australia has made it to the quarter finals of a tournament three times—1998, 2007 and 2009— and its best result was in the most recent tournament held in 2009, in which Australia placed 5th.

Netherlands, 2005 

The 2005 tournament was hosted by the Netherlands. It consisted of a round-robin series conducted in two pools from which the top four teams in each pool qualified for the quarter-finals. Australia finished 5th in its pool, failing to qualify after finishing with a 4–4 record.

Taiwan, 2007 

Australia's performance in the 2007 World Cup was their best ever. They finished 6th and outscored their opponents 61–29 while accumulating a 7–3 record over the course of the tournament, held in Taiwan. Trent Oeltjen was the tournament leader in runs scored (12), stolen bases (7) and batting average (.523), earning him a spot on the All Star team named at the end of the tournament.

Despite the game being shortened to seven innings by the mercy rule, Australia broke the World Cup record for runs scored when they beat Thailand 26–1. The game was also significant in that two position players combined to pitch the final four innings: third baseman Gavin Fingleson threw three innings to record the win, while first baseman Brett Roneberg threw the final inning. Finishing 6th for the tournament earned Australia an automatic berth in the 2009 World Cup.

Europe, 2009 

In September, Australia was one of 22 nations that sent a team to the 2009 World Cup, which was held in seven different countries across Europe. For the first round they were drawn in Pool A, held in Prague, Czech Republic, and competed against Chinese Taipei, Mexico and the hosts Czech Republic. Only a few days after selecting their 24 player squad, Australia was forced to find a replacement for Justin Huber—one of the two players selected with Major League experience—as he was called up from AAA Rochester Red Wings to MLB Minnesota Twins. James Linger was selected as his replacement, making his Australian senior team debut.

First round 
Australia started its campaign with a win in the opening game of the tournament against their first round hosts, Czech Republic. Winning 17–4, one of the highlights was Timothy Kennelly hitting a home run and then a 3-run home run in his first two at bats. Both he and his brother Matthew Kennelly made their national team debut in the game. Following a rest day, Australia faced Chinese Taipei and won 7–5. Australia's hitting was led by Timothy Kennelly another 3-run home run in the third inning to make the score 4–0 (in addition to an outfield assist from right field to save a run in the sixth inning), and James Beresford hitting a 2-run shot in the eighth inning to break the tie and score what would turn out to be the winning runs. This win, combined with Mexico's defeat of Czech Republic assured Australia's progression through to the second round, and determining that their second round play (as well as any further play beyond the second round that they were to qualify for) would be in Italy. In their final game of the first round Australia lost to Mexico 10–9. Given that both teams had already qualified not only for the second round, but would both be playing in the same pool for the round, only momentum into the next round—and their next match in a potentially deciding final game of the pool—was on the line.

Pool A

Game 1

Game 3

Game 5

Second round 
Finishing second in their first round pool, Australia qualified for the second round to play in Pool G. Apart from their hosts Italy, the other teams to qualify for Pool G were Canada, Chinese Taipei, Japan, Mexico, Netherlands Antilles and defending champions United States.

Despite being ranked behind five of the teams in its pool on the IBAF World Rankings at the time, Australia finished the round with a 5–2. This tied with Canada and Chinese Taipei, and with the tiebreakers used in the tournament, meant Australia was second, behind only the United States. The Australians compiled a mercy rule victory over the Netherlands Antilles, victories over world No. 3 Japan, world No. 7 Mexico, world No. 8 Canada, and hosts and world No. 15 Italy, while their only defeats were by one run each at the hands of world No. 4 United States and world No. 5 Chinese Taipei.

Pool G

Game 1

Game 6

Game 9

Game 15

Game 21

Game 25

Game 19 (Postponed)

Final round 

Group 2

Game 1

Game 6

|-

Game 12

Game 15

|-

5th place Final

Panama, 2011 

Australia is scheduled to participate in the 2011 tournament in Panama, to be held in October 2011. They will in the same pool for the first round of as Cuba, Dominican Republic, Germany, Italy, Nicaragua, South Korea, and Venezuela.

Overall record

See also 
Australian Baseball Federation
Australia national baseball team
Baseball World Cup

References

External links 
Australian Baseball Federation
International Baseball Federation

World Cup
Baseball World Cup